Macrometopa is a genus of parasitic flies in the family Tachinidae.

Species
Macrometopa calogaster (Bigot, 1889)

References

Dexiinae
Diptera of North America
Tachinidae genera
Taxa named by Friedrich Moritz Brauer
Monotypic Brachycera genera
Taxa named by Julius von Bergenstamm